The IP postcode area, also known as the Ipswich postcode area, is a group of 33 postcode districts in the east of England, within 15 post towns. These cover most of Suffolk (including Ipswich, Bury St Edmunds, Aldeburgh, Brandon, Eye, Felixstowe, Halesworth, Leiston, Saxmundham, Southwold, Stowmarket and Woodbridge), plus southern Norfolk (including Thetford, Diss and Harleston) and a very small part of Cambridgeshire.



Coverage
The approximate coverage of the postcode districts:

|-
! IP1
| IPSWICH
| North West Ipswich, Akenham
| Ipswich
|-
! IP2
| IPSWICH
| South West Ipswich, Belstead, Wherstead, Stoke Park
| Ipswich
|-
! IP3
| IPSWICH
| South East Ipswich, Ravenswood
| Ipswich
|-
! IP4
| IPSWICH
| North East Ipswich
| Ipswich
|-
! IP5
| IPSWICH
| Rushmere St Andrew, Kesgrave, Martlesham Heath
| East Suffolk
|-
! IP6
| IPSWICH
| Needham Market, Creeting St. Mary, Barham, Henley, Claydon, Witnesham
| Mid Suffolk, East Suffolk
|-
! IP7
| IPSWICH
| Hadleigh, Milden
| Babergh
|-
! IP8
| IPSWICH
| Copdock, Belstead
| Babergh
|-
! IP9
| IPSWICH
| Shotley Peninsula: Capel St Mary, Chelmondiston, Shotley
| Babergh
|-
! IP10
| IPSWICH           
| Kirton, Nacton, Levington
| East Suffolk
|-
! IP11
| FELIXSTOWE
| Felixstowe, Trimley St. Martin, Trimley St. Mary
| East Suffolk
|-
! IP12
| WOODBRIDGE
| Woodbridge, Orford
| East Suffolk
|-
! IP13
| WOODBRIDGE
| Woodbridge, Easton, Framlingham, Little Bealings, Laxfield,
| East Suffolk, Mid Suffolk
|-
! IP14
| STOWMARKET
| Stowmarket, Stowupland
| Mid Suffolk
|-
! IP15
| ALDEBURGH
| Aldeburgh
| East Suffolk
|-
! IP16
| LEISTON
| Leiston, Aldringham, Eastbridge, Sizewell, Theberton, Thorpeness
| East Suffolk
|-
! IP17
| SAXMUNDHAM
| Saxmundham
| East Suffolk
|-
! IP18
| SOUTHWOLD
| Southwold, Easton Bavents, Reydon, Walberswick
| East Suffolk
|-
! IP19
| HALESWORTH
| Cratfield, Ubbeston, Halesworth, Walpole Rumburgh
| East Suffolk
|-
! IP20
| HARLESTON
| Mendham, Withersdale Street, Metfield, Wortwell, Redenhall
| South Norfolk, East Suffolk
|-
! rowspan="2"|IP21
| DISS
| Thorpe Abbotts, Pulham Market, Pulham St Mary, Wingfield
| South Norfolk, Mid Suffolk
|-
| EYE
| Stradbroke, Fressingfield, Syleham
| Mid Suffolk, South Norfolk
|-
! IP22
| DISS
| Diss, Winfarthing, Burston, Roydon, Garboldisham, Botesdale 
| South Norfolk, Mid Suffolk
|-
! IP23
| EYE
| Eye, Thorndon, Thwaite, Brome 
| Mid Suffolk
|-
! IP24
| THETFORD
| Thetford, Barnham, Great Hockham
| Breckland, West Suffolk
|-
! IP25
| THETFORD
|Watton,  Saham Toney
| Breckland
|-
! IP26
| THETFORD
| Hilborough, Northwold
| Breckland, King's Lynn and West Norfolk  
|-
! IP27
| BRANDON
| Brandon, Lakenheath
| West Suffolk, King's Lynn and West Norfolk
|-
! IP28
| BURY ST. EDMUNDS
| Mildenhall, Culford, Red Lodge
| West Suffolk, East Cambridgeshire
|-
! IP29
| BURY ST. EDMUNDS
| Barrow, Shimpling
| West Suffolk
|-
! IP30
| BURY ST. EDMUNDS
| Elmswell, Cockfield, Woolpit
| West Suffolk, Mid Suffolk
|-
! IP31
| BURY ST. EDMUNDS
| Ixworth, Thurston, Great Barton, Stanton
| West Suffolk, Mid Suffolk
|-
! IP32
| BURY ST. EDMUNDS
| 
| West Suffolk
|-
! IP33
| BURY ST. EDMUNDS
| Westley
| West Suffolk
|-
! style="background:#FFFFFF;"|IP98
| style="background:#FFFFFF;"|DISS
| style="background:#FFFFFF;"|Bulk Mail
| style="background:#FFFFFF;"|non-geographic
|}

Map

See also
Postcode Address File
List of postcode areas in the United Kingdom

References

External links
Royal Mail's Postcode Address File
A quick introduction to Royal Mail's Postcode Address File (PAF)

Ipswich
Postcode areas covering the East of England